Andrew Pollock is the name of two cricketers:

Andrew Maclean Pollock (1914–1969), Scottish-born South African cricketer
Andrew Graeme Pollock (born 1969), South African cricketer, son of Andrew Maclean Pollock

See also
 Pollock (surname)